Keith Pettiford  (15 February 1915 – 20 November 1942) was an Australian RAAF officer who died in WWII and rugby league footballer who played in the New South Wales Rugby League for Sydney University.

Early life and rugby league career
Pettiford was born on 15 February 1915 in Wollongong to parents Henry Augustine and Ellen Scott Pettiford. He graduated from the University of Sydney with a B.A. degree, and appeared once as wing for the university's rugby league team in 1937.

Military career
Pettiford worked as a public school teacher in his hometown of Wollongong. He enlisted in the Royal Australian Air Force on 28 April 1941 in Sydney. Rising through the ranks to flying officer, Pettiford served in England as part of No. 27 Operations Training Unit RAF, flying Vickers Wellington bombers from RAF Lichfield. On 20 November 1942, serving as a flight navigator on Vickers Wellington Z1744, Pettiford and the other five crewmen aboard were killed when the bomber crashed near Upper Hulme. The Wellington had been intercepted by two American Supermarine Spitfires while the bomber was conducting a training flight. One of the fighters cut the radio line used to communicate with the airbase, causing Z1744's crew to become disoriented and to eventually crash. Pettiford and the other Australian casualties were buried in Fradley (St. Stephen) Cemetery.

Career statistics

References

1915 births
1942 deaths
Australian military personnel killed in World War II
Australian rugby league players
Australian schoolteachers
Flight navigators
Royal Australian Air Force officers
Royal Australian Air Force personnel of World War II
Rugby league players from Wollongong
Rugby league wingers
Sydney University rugby league team players
University of Sydney alumni